Snakehouse is the first album by the Canadian rock band The Cliks, released in 2007.

Critical reception
Exclaim! wrote that the group "wield a power behind their songwriting that is conveyed through barebones sincerity and skilfully delivered sonic explosions that hammer out fierce arrangements and defiant melodies." The Chicago Tribune called the album a "collection of guitar-driven stomach-churners ... amplified by [Silveira's] fiery vocals and a sense that he's not willing to stay silent anymore." The Cleveland Scene described it as "Joan Jett-size riffs dished out with a side of power-pop stomp."

Track listing
All songs by Lucas Silveira, except "Cry Me a River" by Tim Mosley, Scott Storch and Justin Timberlake.
"Complicated" - 4:35
"Cry Me a River" - 4:31
"Misery" - 3:42
"Eyes In the Back of My Head" - 3:19
"Soul Back Driver" - 3:33
"Start Leading Me On" - 3:12
"Whenever" - 3:48
"Oh Yeah" - 4:34
"Nobody Else Will" - 4:49
"Back In Style" - 3:40

References

2007 albums
The Cliks albums
Albums produced by Scott Storch